Azerbaijan–Equatorial Guinea relations are the bilateral relations between Azerbaijan and Equatorial Guinea in the political, socio-economic, cultural and other spheres.

Cooperation between countries is mainly carried out in the fields of energy, investment, trade, education, etc.

Diplomatic relations      
Diplomatic relations between Azerbaijan and Equatorial Guinea were first established on November 11, 2004.

The Extraordinary Ambassador of Equatorial Guinea to Azerbaijan is Jose Esono Micha Akenga.

In October 2019, President of Equatorial Guinea Teodoro Obiang Nguema Mbasogo paid an official visit to Azerbaijan to participate in the XVIII summit of heads of states which are members of the Non-Aligned Movement

Economic cooperation 
According to statistics from the UN Trade Office (COMTRADE), in 2011, the volume of export of tools, implements, and cutlery from Azerbaijan amounted to 1.21 thousand us dollars.

International cooperation 
In the international arena, cooperation between the countries is carried out within the framework of various international organizations: Non-Aligned Movement, Gas Exporting Countries Forum (GECF), etc.

In December 2016, Azerbaijan and Equatorial Guinea, as well as other non-OPEC countries, agreed to reduce their annual oil production

In November 2019, Azerbaijani President Ilham Aliyev was invited to Equatorial Guinea for the fifth summit of the heads of states which are members of the Gas Exporting Countries Forum.

See also 
Foreign relations of Azerbaijan
Foreign relations of Equatorial Guinea

References 

Equatorial Guinea
Azerbaijan